My So-Called Life is the second and final album by the Chicago-based nu metal music group From Zero. The album was released on May 6, 2003 via Arista Records. Due to a lack of promotion by Arista Records, poor reviews, and general changes in mainstream music tastes, the album did not sell many copies.  The album features a cover of Phil Collins' "I Don't Care Anymore".

Track listing

Personnel
Jett – vocals, bass
Pete Capizzi –  rhythm guitar, backing vocals
Joe Pettinato –  lead guitar 
Kid – drums
Warren riker - producer, mixing, engineering, mastering

References

2003 albums
From Zero albums
Arista Records albums